Wiltjas are shelters made by the Pitjantjatjara, Yankunytjatjara and other Aboriginal Australian peoples. They are temporary dwellings, and are abandoned and rebuilt rather than maintained. Open and semi-circular, wiltjas are meant primarily as a defence against the heat of the sun, and are not an effective shelter from rain.

See also 

 Humpy

References

Photographs
 Aboriginal people outside a wiltja shelter made of bark and branches c.1914  - State Library of Victoria
Aboriginal bough shelter known as a “wiltja”, at Desert Tracks Pitjantjatjara Tours camp - Alamy
Indigenous architecture

Huts in Australia
Australian Aboriginal bushcraft
Architecture in Australia